Annette Sattel (born 19 May 1971) is a French former sports shooter. She competed in the women's 10 metre air rifle event at the 1992 Summer Olympics.

References

External links
 

1971 births
Living people
French female sport shooters
Olympic shooters of France
Shooters at the 1992 Summer Olympics
People from Saverne
Sportspeople from Bas-Rhin